NACA is the National Advisory Committee for Aeronautics, a former federal agency of the US government, the forerunner of NASA.
 
NACA may also refer to:

Organizations
 National Agricultural Chemicals Association
 National Association for Campus Activities, an organization for programmers of university and college activities 
 National Association of Consumer Advocates, an organization of consumer lawyers
 National Athletic and Cycling Association, a sports organization of Ireland
 Neighborhood Assistance Corporation of America, a non-profit community advocacy and homeownership organization
 Network of Aquaculture Centres in Asia-Pacific, an intergovernmental organization that promotes rural development through sustainable aquaculture
 National Civil Aviation Agency (Mauritania)
 Native American Community Academy
 Northern Alberta Curling Association, the regional governing body for the sport of curling in Northern Alberta prior to 2018

Science and technology
 NACA (gene), a human gene
 NACA duct, a type of air intake for an engine
 NACA airfoil, airfoil shapes for aircraft wings developed by NACA
 NACA cowling, a type of aerodynamic fairing used to streamline radial engines for use on airplanes 
 N-Acetylcysteine amide, an amide derivative of N-acetylcysteine